WVVY-LP (96.7 FM) is a radio station licensed to Tisbury, Massachusetts, United States, and serving part of Martha's Vineyard. The station is owned by Martha's Vineyard Community Radio, Inc. It is a community radio station with a freeform format. WVVY-LP operates at 100 watts and has a range of three to five miles.

See also
List of community radio stations in the United States

References

External links
 WVVY-LP official website
 

VVY-LP
VVY-LP
Martha's Vineyard
Community radio stations in the United States
Radio stations established in 2007